Skids (Sally Blevins) is a fictional mutant character appearing in American comic books published by Marvel Comics.

Publication history

Created by writer Louise Simonson and artist Jackson Guice, Skids first appeared in X-Factor #7 (August 1986), first as one of the sewer-dwelling Morlocks and then as a young ward of X-Factor. She remained as a supporting character through X-Factor #33, but during the events of Inferno, she formed the X-Terminators along with peers Boom-Boom, Rusty Collins, and Rictor, as well as younger mutant children Artie Maddicks, Leech, and Wiz Kid, in X-Terminators #1-4 (1988). After Inferno, Skids (along with the older three X-Terminators) joined the remaining members of the New Mutants in New Mutants vol. 1 #76, but leaves the title as a regular after joining the Mutant Liberation Front with Rusty in New Mutants vol. 1 #87 (1990). Skids would then leave regular publication but appear semi-regularly as an antagonist to the X-Men and X-Force, originally with the MLF in X-Men (vol. 2) #13-15 (1992) and X-Force #24 (1993), but later with the Acolytes: X-Men (vol. 2) #25 (1993), Cable #10-11 (1994); The Uncanny X-Men #315 (1994), and X-Men (vol. 2) #42-44 (1995). Subsequently, Skids left the Acolytes and appeared infrequently in publication, only in isolated stories: as a college student trying to rebuild her life in X-Force #78-80, 85 (1998–99), as a member of the X-Corporation in X-Treme X-Men #42-46 (2004), as one of The 198 in X-Men (vol. 2) #183-184 (2006), as a S.H.I.E.L.D. agent infiltrating the Morlocks in The Uncanny X-Men #487-491 (2007), and most recently, still with S.H.I.E.L.D. in Tales of Suspense #101-104 (2018).

Fictional character biography

Morlocks
Little has been revealed of Sally Blevins' past. As a teenager, when she was abused by her stepfather, her mother Matilda was fatally injured in the altercation, and her stepfather fled when her mutant power subsequently manifested to protect her. Sally ended up a runaway, living on, or rather under, the streets with the Morlocks, a group of homeless mutants. Most Morlocks voluntarily (or, in some cases, involuntarily) took on inhuman appearances at the hands of the Morlock facial sculptor, Masque. Sally's force field protected her from Masque's power, allowing her to maintain her normal appearance, leading to resentment from some Morlocks. At one point, Skids encountered Rusty Collins, while he was being pursued by Freedom Force (government-chartered mutant enforcers composed of former members of the Brotherhood of Evil Mutants) and a mob of mutant-hating humans. Rusty had accidentally injured a woman with his pyrokinetic powers and was wanted by the U.S Government. Skids' force field allowed the two to easily escape, but were eventually overtaken by Freedom Force on the edge of Central Park.

Before the evil mutants could take them in, a mob of humans attacked Freedom Force. In the confusion, Skids and Rusty escaped. Skids tried to get Rusty to the safety of the underground home of the Morlocks, but Freedom Force caught up with them again, this time in the sewers beneath New York. The Force member Blob was pounding Rusty into the sewer wall when the mutant hero team X-Factor arrived. After a brief skirmish, Freedom Force retreated and Skids and Rusty were left in X-Factor's hands.

X-Factor, X-Terminators, and New Mutants
With X-Factor's mentorship, Skids and Rusty  began to learn more about their powers, and were the first of several X-Factor trainees. They shared other adventures alongside the rest of X-Factor's  trainees, at one point calling themselves the  X-Terminators.

During the Inferno storyline, the X-Terminators teamed up with the New Mutants to help rescue mutant babies from the demon N'astirh, who was using them to help keep open a portal to Limbo. Skids aided the New Mutants and Namor the Sub-Mariner against an undersea monster. At the conclusion of Inferno, Skids joined the New Mutants, along with Rusty, Rictor and Boom Boom. Skids and Rusty learned that Freedom Force were taking mutant infants that were abducted during the demonic invasion into government custody for exploitation. Rusty and Skids were separated from the group for some time. Freedom Force surrounded them at the Statue of Liberty island. Skids' force field blocks their attacks but they simply wait until pure exhaustion drops her. Rusty's flames are neutralized by the Freedom Force member Pyro, who can control any flames generated by another source. The pair was captured by Freedom Force.

The other New Mutants were unable to rescue their friends due to their concurrent adventures. Rusty and Skids escaped from their prison cells to stop the criminals Nitro and Vulture. They escaped the federal prison and defeated Nitro, but thanks to the fight Rusty was brought back into the sights of Freedom Force. While attempting to escape, he was severely injured by the Blob and they were recaptured by Freedom Force. While recovering in the hospital, he and Skids were contacted by members of the Mutant Liberation Front. With soldiers opening fire on them, they felt there was no other choice than to join them.

The Mutant Liberation Front
Shortly thereafter, Rusty and Skids were brainwashed by Stryfe into following him blindly. Due to this, Rusty and Skids had no qualms about attacking former teammate Cannonball during the X-Cutioner's Song storyline. At the end of this story, the Mutant Liberation Front were turned in to the authorities.

Shortly after, Rusty and Skids were kidnapped by the Friends of Humanity. While being transported, X-Force (the team created by the former members of the New Mutants), rescued them. Arriving back at their base, X-Force was soon confronted by Exodus. He was inviting original New Mutants Cannonball and Sunspot to Avalon, a "safe haven" for selected mutants. Cannonball refused to go unless all former New Mutants present (Boom Boom, Rictor, Rusty and Skids) were invited also. While Exodus complained that Rusty and Skids were "damaged" due to their brainwashing, he finally acquiesced.

Avalon
Upon arriving at Avalon, the mutants were taken to "the Savior" (in reality Magneto), who used his powers to undo the brainwashing done to Rusty and Skids. When X-Force arrived to save their friends, Rusty and Skids decided they would stay with Magneto, feeling that they owed him. With thus being done, they joined the Acolytes.

Shortly after the Age of Apocalypse storyline, a mutant body (Holocaust) was discovered floating in space near Avalon. It was brought on board. While on guard duty watching over the thought-to-be frozen body, Rusty's life force was drained by Holocaust, killing him.  Holocaust then destroyed the Avalon space station leaving Skids stranded on a piece of debris plummeting away from the station, struggling to maintain her force field. Skids was rescued by Jean Grey and taken to the X-Men's mansion for medical attention.

College
Skids had become a college student, studying biological sciences. She was contacted by her friends in X-Force who were on a cross-country road trip, but they were all attacked by the villain Reignfire, who was then leading an incarnation of the Mutant Liberation Front. During the encounter, Skids' force field disrupted the teleportation abilities of MLF member Locus, causing both of them to be caught in a trans-spatial backlash which deposited them in the Balkan country of Latveria. Skids and Locus were then captured by an age-old sorceress named Pandemonia, the self-styled Queen of Chaos, who sought to recruit mutants into her own personal army, but Skids and X-Force defeated her with the assistance of the young sorceress Jennifer Kale.

X-Corporation
Despite her decision to remove herself from mutant-related activity and superheroism, Skids was nonetheless eventually recruited by former New Mutant teammate Sunspot, now a leader of the Los Angeles branch of the X-Corporation (a worldwide network supporting mutant causes), to join his cause.  This faction assisted the X-Treme X-Men after the villain Elias Bogan took mental possession of some of their members.  Skids was defeated in battle by the possessed Bishop, who attached a generator to her which caused her spin rapidly on the surface of her own slippery force field.  Eventually, though, the remaining heroes defeated Bogan.

Shortly afterwards, X-Men founder Charles Xavier (who also founded the X-Corps initially) had the network disbanded when he decided the world had become too dangerous for mutants in the public sector, and Skids presumably returned to a civilian life.

M-Day and Apocalypse
When the reality warping-mutant the Scarlet Witch used her powers to negate the abilities of most of the world's mutants' superhuman abilities (an event subsequently referred to as M-Day), Skids found herself surprised and possibly even disappointed to learn that she retained her own powers.  In the anti-mutant aftermath that followed, Skids wound up being one of several remaining mutants seeking refuge on Xavier's estate, sharing a tent with the mutants Magma and Outlaw. During this time, the ancient X-Men nemesis Apocalypse attacked the estate with his loyal Horsemen. The Horseman Famine sapped the energies of the camping refugees, forcing them to crave sustenance of any kind.  When Apocalypse offered his empowered blood to them, it was all that the heroes could do to keep Skids and other desperate mutants from accepting the evil substance. Despite this near-betrayal, Xavier forgave Skids and the others and allowed them to remain on the grounds. Skids eventually departed the camp and was not heard of again for some time.

S.H.I.E.L.D.
Skids becomes an agent of S.H.I.E.L.D. and is assigned to pose as an operative of Masque's splinter group of Morlocks, who attempt to carry out the designs of the late Morlock precognitive Qwerty. Simultaneously, she is assigned to infiltrate Masque's Morlock rivals, a more pacifistic sect that were nonetheless equally devoted to Qwerty and her book of prophecies. This sect made the underground sanctuary Lindisfarne their home base, which housed their sacred text of Qwerty's scripture. In both roles, Skids apparently feigned equal devotion to Qwerty's prophecies.

Appearing as a reluctant and listless (and possibly alcoholic) recruit of Masque's faction, she purposefully took part in Masque's plan to disfigure humans by bombing a subway train with a gene-altering chemical weapon. Her deep cover prevented her from interfering when Masque went on to deform them with his powers. She also did nothing to stop Masque and his cohort Bliss when they decided to abduct and torture Leech, her former friend from when they were X-Factor trainees. The X-Men Storm, Warpath, Hepzibah and ex-Morlock Caliban go after Masque in the tunnels, and find Skids unconscious after she was caught in the crossfire of an attempted raid on Masque's crew by other S.H.I.E.L.D. agents. They wonder why she is there, and while Caliban defends her character, Storm questions her loyalty due to her complicated history with the X-Men. When a S.H.I.E.L.D. Sentinel attacks the X-Men, thinking them to be Masque loyalists, Skids recovers and takes charge of the investigation. She then fills the X-Men in on her assignment and Qwerty's prophecies, and leads them to Lindisfarne and introduces them to Qwerty's friend and priestess Delphi.

Later, Skids and the X-Men are captured by Masque's crew. Masque wants to initiate a war between humans and remaining mutants via a devastating terrorist attack, and leave his captives' corpses at the scene to further de-legitimize Xavier's vision. The captives escape, and while the X-Men defeat Masque, Skids leaves the scene with Qwerty's book.

Skids found Magneto at a local cemetery and gave him the book, informing him that she would get into a lot of trouble if her actions were discovered. She stated that the book said Magneto was still a mutant.

Powers and abilities 

Sally Blevins is a mutant with power over a semipermeable personal protective deflection field. It provides nearly total protection from all attacks except those of insufficient force, like gas. Her force field disperses energy assaults, reflects kinetic impact off itself, and negates friction making it impossible to hold on to her. Skids cannot be grabbed or entangled when using her powers. This also makes her immune to Masque's powers, as he cannot touch her. Skids can move at speeds which are faster than running, by "skating" the surface of her force field across other surfaces.

Originally, Sally was unable to turn off her force field but learned with practice.

Other versions

Age of Apocalypse
In 10th anniversary of the Age of Apocalypse, Skids made a brief appearance. Like many other mutants not deemed worthy enough to serve Apocalypse, Skids' was one of many inmates in the Breeding Pens that escaped after the fall of Apocalypse. She along with a trail of escaped mutants took residence in the sewers and created once again the Morlocks society. They did not trust any outsiders, not even the X-Men, now mutant hunting officers of the newly restored human government, when they ventured into Morlock territory, inviting them to come and live with them in the surface world. The Morlocks lashed out at them for fear of being locked up and thrown back into cages by them. Due to the experiments she was put through in the Breeding Pens, Skids' powers have been mastered to such a point that she could shield herself and several others from Storm's lightning bolts. Nonetheless, the X-Men would emerge victorious and the Morlocks were brought back to the Xavier Institute where they were detained. Their fates after being remanded into government custody is unknown.

What If
In the reality shown in What if (vol. 2) #85, Xavier and Magneto set their differences aside peacefully, and Avalon was left undisturbed in Earth’s orbit. However, Magneto’s dream of a peaceful haven for mutants did not come true, for no more than ten years later, his Acolytes were at each other's throats. Some of them wanted to move Avalon to another galaxy, thinking that they were still too close to humanity’s influence, whereas the others believed that they should kill humanity and conquer Earth for themselves. Rusty and Skids stayed away from either side and the constant fights, them being busier with themselves, as they were expecting a child. Hank McCoy helped to deliver Avalon’s first baby, and examining the boy, he found something special in his genetic make-up. Apparently the son of Sally and Rusty, Sean Collins, was the next step in human evolution – Homo ultima – capable of choosing and altering his mutation at maturity. As the word spread, the different Acolyte factions put their differences aside, and feeling threatened by the arrival of a new race, they teamed up to attract Rusty and Skids and kill their baby. With Sean dead, Sally and Rusty turned their back on the Acolytes and returned to Earth. The sad part was that actually the boy was a normal mutant; Magneto had faked the test results, well aware that his Acolytes needed a common enemy to unite against.

In other media

Skids made an appearance in the X-Men episode "No Mutant is an Island", voiced by Tara Strong.

References

External links
 Skids at Marvel.com
 UncannyXmen.net Spotlight on Skids

Characters created by Jackson Guice
Characters created by Louise Simonson
Comics characters introduced in 1986
Fictional secret agents and spies
Fictional special forces personnel
Marvel Comics female superheroes
Marvel Comics female supervillains
Marvel Comics mutants
New Mutants
S.H.I.E.L.D. agents
X-Factor (comics)